Poghos Galstyan (born on 10 January 1961) is a former Armenian football midfielder and current manager.

International
He has participated in 1 international match for the Armenia national team on 16 July 1994 in a home friendly match against Malta.

Personal life
He is the father of Artush Galstyan.

References

Living people
People from Shamkir District
1961 births
Soviet Armenians
Soviet footballers
Armenian footballers
Armenian expatriate footballers
Expatriate footballers in Lebanon
Armenian expatriate sportspeople in Lebanon
Lebanese Premier League players
Homenetmen Beirut footballers
Armenia international footballers
Armenian football managers
Soviet Top League players
FC Ararat Yerevan players
FC Pyunik players
FC Kuban Krasnodar managers
Russian Premier League managers
Armenian expatriate football managers
Expatriate football managers in Russia
Expatriate football managers in Kazakhstan
Association football midfielders